Mycalesis fuscum, the Malayan bush brown, is a butterfly of the family Nymphalidae. It is found on Peninsular Malaysia, Java, Borneo, and Nias.

Subspecies
Mycalesis fuscum fuscum (Peninsular Malaya)
Mycalesis fuscum diniche Hewitson, 1862 (Java)
Mycalesis fuscum adustata Fruhstorfer, 1906 (Borneo)
Mycalesis fuscum musculus Fruhstorfer, 1906 (Nias)

References

Butterflies described in 1860
Mycalesis
Butterflies of Malaysia
Butterflies of Borneo
Butterflies of Java
Taxa named by Baron Cajetan von Felder
Taxa named by Rudolf Felder